, alternatively Girls und Panzer: The Final Chapter, is a six-part Japanese animated film series and a sequel to Girls und Panzer (2012) and Girls und Panzer der Film (2015). Produced by Actas and distributed by Showgate, the film series is directed by Tsutomu Mizushima from a script written by Reiko Yoshida and features an ensemble cast from previous installments of the franchise.

The film series follows the students of Ōarai Girls' Academy helping Momo Kawashima with her university entrance by winning the Winter Continuous Track Cup. With Miho Nishizumi leading the academy's tank unit despite demoting to Vice-Commander to give her commanding position to Momo, Ōarai won the match against BC Freedom Academy and Chihatan Gakuen. They next face off against Keizoku High School in the third match.

A sequel project for the franchise was greenlit in August 2016. Although the project was first teased as a stand-alone film in September 2016, the format was revealed to be a six-part film series in November. The first film in the series was completed four days before its premiere in December 2017. In May 2020, the third film in the series continued its production despite the ongoing COVID-19 pandemic.

Three films in the series have been released in Japan since 2017: Girls und Panzer das Finale: Part 1 on December 9, 2017, Girls und Panzer das Finale: Part 2 on June 15, 2019, and Girls und Panzer das Finale: Part 3 on March 26, 2021. The film series has grossed over million worldwide and received nominations at Newtype Anime Awards and Tokyo Anime Awards Festival. The fourth film in the series, Girls und Panzer das Finale: Part 4, will premiere in Japan in 2023.

Films

Part 1
As winter arrives, Momo Kawashima is determined to find Ōarai Girls' Academy's missing ninth tank. However, news travels throughout the school that Momo has not been accepted by any universities, resulting in a misleading rumor that she might be held back. Miho Nishizumi and her friends figure that they can get Momo accepted into the same university as Anzu Kadotani and Yuzu Koyama if they can demonstrate that Momo is skilled at Sensha-dō. To achieve this, they name Momo as the commander of Ōarai's tank teams and join the Winter Continuous Track Cup. Anglerfish Team travels below the aircraft carrier's deck to find the tank and wins the challenges set by a delinquent group led by Ogin. Learning of Momo's predicament, Ogin's group decides to join them, forming the Shark Team, to repay their debt to Momo for saving them from expulsion. They also recover the missing Mark IV tank being used as a smokehouse. Ōarai faces off against BC Freedom Academy at the start of the tournament. Yukari Akiyama learns through surveillance that the BC Freedom students are deeply divided between the original students and the high school transfer students, with their commander Marie seemingly oblivious of the situation. Confident that BC Freedom lacks the teamwork for a coordinated defense, Ōarai undertakes a direct attack on their flag tank. However, BC Freedom demonstrates an unexpected esprit de corps and traps Ōarai in a crossfire on a bridge. Ōarai uses Shark Team's tank as a makeshift bridge to escape. BC Freedom and Ōarai retreat following the failed ambush.

Part 2
After escaping BC Freedom's ambush, Ōarai uses Mallard Team's Renault Char B1 and the cover of a bocage's hedgerows to pose as a BC Freedom tank and reignite the quarrel between their students. Exploiting their opponent's temporary confusion, Ōarai takes out Marie's flag tank and wins the match. While on a break before the next match, Saori Takebe accompanies Momo to her home and meets her four siblings and her frail mother. Meanwhile, Chihatan Gakuen, Pravda Girls' High School, Saunders University High School, Kuromorimine Girls' High School, St. Gloriana Girls' College, Anzio Girls' High School, and Keizoku High School advance to the next round. Ōarai's next opponent is Chihatan, which adapts a new set of effective tactics that they learned from Ōarai's examples. Chihatan uses hit-and-run attacks and amphibious assaults to launch numerous ambushes on Ōarai, but the latter forces their retreat after luring them into a trap.

Part 3
After regrouping, Chihatan resumes its hit-and-run attacks on Ōarai. Chihatan's commander Kinuyo Nishi decides to focus on taking out Anglerfish Team to destroy Ōarai's morale. Ōarai tank teams quickly become separated in the confusion and multiple skirmishes take place. Miho decides to turn on her tank's headlight to expose her location and draw all of the Chihatan tanks towards her. As Chihatan celebrates after disabling Anglerfish Team's tank, Turtle Team, Ōarai's flag tank, comes out of hiding and disables Kinuyo's tank, winning the match in the process. In other matches, Kuromorimine defeats Pravda after Erika Itsumi followed Maho Nishizumi's advice and used her tactics that diverge from the school's traditional frontal attack, St. Gloriana easily defeats Anzio, and Keizoku manages to pull an upset victory against Saunders. This leaves Ōarai to face off against Keizoku and Kuromorimine against St. Gloriana in the semifinals. At the outset of the third match, Keizoku uses hit-and-run attacks and guerilla tactics against Ōarai, splitting their forces as a result. As Anglerfish Team protects the Anteater Team, their flag tank, one of the Keizoku's tank team, commanded by the one known as the "White Witch", disables Miho's tank with a single long-range shot.

Cast and staff

Voice cast
The table shows the Japanese voice cast (green-colored cells) of the three films in the Girls und Panzer das Finale series and the English dub cast (white-colored cells) of the series' first three films.

Staff

Production
The Girls und Panzer Heartful Tank Carnival II event announced the start of the anime sequel project's production for the Girls und Panzer franchise in August 2016. At Tokyo Game Show in September 2016, producer Kiyoshi Sugiyama indicated the project to be a film but later retracted his comments, apologizing for the confusion he had caused and asking the fans to wait for the reveal instead. The format of the project was revealed to be a six-part anime film series at the 20th Ōarai Anglerfish Festival in November 2016. Screenwriter Reiko Yoshida revealed that the sequel was intended to be released as an original video animation. By the time the decision to make six films had been made, Yoshida began writing the script for the last film first and worked from there backward to adjust the length of the overall story.

The first film in the series, Girls und Panzer das Finale: Part 1, revealed new cast in October 2017, including Yumi Hara as Marie, Minami Tsuda as Ando, Chika Anzai as Oshida, and Ayane Sakura as a "mysterious new character". Director Tsutomu Mizushima announced the completion of the film four days before its theatrical release in December 2017. In the same month, Sakura's character in the film was revealed to be Ogin, with Natsumi Takamori, Yō Taichi, Madoka Yonezawa, and Ami Nanase joining her to respectively voice Rum, Murakami, Flint, and Cutlass. Sentai Filmworks revealed the English staff and dub cast for the film in September 2021.

During the production of the second film in the series, Girls und Panzer das Finale: Part 2, the staff used Unreal Engine 4 for the jungle match between Ōarai Girls' Academy and Chihatan Gakuen. In May 2019, Mizushima revealed that the film would be seven minutes longer than the first film. Sentai Filmworks revealed the English staff and dub cast for the film in December 2021.

The third film in the series, Girls und Panzer das Finale: Part 3, continued its production despite the ongoing COVID-19 pandemic, with Mizushima stating that the staff started to edit the film and prepare for the cast's dialogue recording in May 2020. Sentai Filmworks revealed the English staff and dub cast for the film in December 2022.

The fourth film in the series, Girls und Panzer das Finale: Part 4, began its production in April 2021.

In February 2022, Mizushima confirmed on his Twitter account that he began to work on the contents of the fifth film in the series, Girls und Panzer das Finale: Part 5, although the progress might be "intermittent" due to other work commitments.

Music
In July 2017, Sayaka Sasaki was revealed as the performer of the opening theme music for the first three films in the Girls und Panzer das Finale series, titled "Grand Symphony", and ChouCho as the performer of the opening theme music for the final three films after previously doing so for Girls und Panzer (2012) and Girls und Panzer der Film (2015). Fuchigami, Kayano, Ozaki, Nakagami, and Iguchi performed the new arrangement of "Enter Enter Mission!" song as the ending theme music for the film series. Lantis released the original soundtrack of the first three films in the series, which was composed by Shirō Hamaguchi, on May 12, 2021.

Marketing
In September 2016, Bandai Namco Arts released the teaser trailer for the Girls und Panzer das Finale film series, which was first shown at the Girls und Panzer Heartful Tank Carnival II event last month. A teaser visual for Girls und Panzer das Finale: Part 1 was released in March 2017. A teaser trailer for Girls und Panzer das Finale: Part 2 was released in July 2018. A teaser trailer and visual for Girls und Panzer das Finale: Part 3 were released in September 2020. A limited advanced ticket for the fourth film was given to attendees of the screening of the first three films at Shinjuku Wald 9 in Tokyo on April 11, 2022, in commemoration of the 15th anniversary of the theater's opening.  A teaser trailer and two teaser visuals for Girls und Panzer das Finale: Part 4 were released in November 2022.

Promotional partners in Japan did collaboration with the film series: Pacific Racing Team, a motorsport team; Lawson; Tsutaya, which released a film series-inspired design for their T-Card membership cards; Mastercard, which released their card design based on the five members of Anglerfish Team; Coco's, a family restaurant; Daily Yamazaki; Morinaga Milk Industry; Sega, which set up a collaboration cafe; HMV & Books; Joysound, a karaoke brand; Baskin-Robbins; Marion Crepes, an ice cream store; World of Tanks; Tower Records; Seiko; Cospa; Big Echo; Saza Coffee, a coffee shop; The Chara, a shopping site for anime goods; Azora Gear, which unveiled a hand warmer with Miho Nishizumi design; and Dandadan, a gyoza restaurant.

Release

Theatrical
Girls und Panzer das Finale: Part 1 was released in Japan on December 9, 2017. Girls und Panzer das Finale: Part 2  was released in Japan on June 15, 2019, and in Dolby Atmos and DTS:X theaters on August 16. The first and second films in the series were released as one in 59 4DX and 20 MX4D theaters on October 11, 2019. Girls und Panzer das Finale: Part 3 was released in Japan on March 26, 2021, and in 78 4DX and MX4D theaters on October 8. Girls und Panzer das Finale: Part 4 is set to be released in Japan in 2023.

Home media
Girls und Panzer das Finale: Part 1 was released on Blu-ray and DVD in Japan on March 23, 2018. Sentai Filmworks released the first film in the series on Blu-ray in the United States and Canada on September 14, 2021, while Hidive began streaming it on December 13. MVM Entertainment released the film on Blu-ray in the United Kingdom and Ireland on April 11, 2022.

Girls und Panzer das Finale: Part 2 was released on Blu-ray and DVD in Japan on February 27, 2020. They include a new original video animation (OVA) titled "Taiyaki War!". Sentai Filmworks released the second film in the series on Blu-ray in the United States and Canada on November 23, 2021. Hidive began streaming the film on February 21, 2022. MVM Entertainment released the film on Blu-ray in the United Kingdom and Ireland on May 16, 2022.

Girls und Panzer das Finale: Part 3 was released on Blu-ray and DVD in Japan on December 24, 2021. They include a new OVA titled "Daikon War!". Sentai Filmworks released the film on Blu-ray in the United States and Canada on September 20, 2022. MVM Entertainment released the film in the United Kingdom and Ireland on October 31, 2022. Hidive began streaming the film on December 19, 2022.

Reception

Box office

Girls und Panzer das Finale: Part 1 earned million in its opening weekend in Japan in December 2017, ranking fourth at the box office. It grossed more than million in its sixth weekend.

Girls und Panzer das Finale: Part 2 earned million in its opening weekend in Japan in June 2019, 100.9% more than the first film did in its opening weekend, and ranked fourth behind Godzilla: King of the Monsters (2019). The film earned  in its second weekend.

Girls und Panzer das Finale: Part 3 earned  in its opening weekend in Japan in March 2021, ranking sixth at the box office. In its second weekend, the film earned  and dropped to tenth place at the box office.

Critical response
Ian Wolf of Anime UK News gave Girls und Panzer das Finale: Part 1 9 out of 10, praising the production, the comedy with the "humour [that] is basic and based on stereotyping, but... it works", the "pleasing" new naval tank characters, and a "pretty good" opening theme music. In regards to the whole film series, he felt "frustrat[ed]" about how it is taking a long time to be completed due to the "two-year gap between each one" and suggested "mak[ing] a few longer films rather than many short ones".

In his review of Girls und Panzer das Finale: Part 2 with a score of 9 out of 10, Wolf praised the action scenes, describing it as "thrilling, with unexpected twists and turns", the music, and the film's "slightly longer" runtime.

The Japanese review and survey firm Filmarks reported that Girls und Panzer das Finale: Part 3 had an approval rating of 4.17 out of 5, based on 284 reviews, placing the film first in their first-day satisfaction ranking. Hatafumi Nobu gave the third film in the series 9 out of 10 for IGN Japan, praising the tank action sequence, the "inductive flow and cliffhanger-style" direction for a 48-minute runtime, and the "exquisitely composed" sound. Wolf gave the film a score of 8 out of 10. He noted the use of mixed CGI during the scene taking place in the jungle and found the characters being animated with CGI "disappointingly clunky". As for the action scenes, Wolf found it in Part 3 "more substantial" as compared to Part 2.

Accolades
In December 2018, Girls und Panzer das Finale: Part 1 was included in the list nominated to win the Anime of the Year at Tokyo Anime Award Festival 2019. In December 2021, Girls und Panzer das Finale: Part 3 was among the Top 100 Favorites nominated for the Anime of the Year at Tokyo Anime Award Festival 2022. In December 2022, Part 3s 4D version placed sixteenth among the top 20 Japanese animated films voted by fans to win the Anime of the Year at Tokyo Anime Award Festival 2023.

|-
! scope="row" rowspan="2" | 2018
| rowspan="3" | Newtype Anime Awards
| Best Picture (Film)
| Girls und Panzer das Finale: Part 1
| 
| rowspan="2" | 
|-
| rowspan="2" | Best Mechanical/Prop Design
| Takeshi Itou
| 
|-
! scope="row" | 2019
| Takeshi Itou, Takao Takegami, Noriko Ogura, Momoko Makiuchi, and Kanta Suzuki
| 
| 
|-

Related manga

Girls und Panzer das Finale: Heartful Tank Anthology
A manga anthology based on Girls und Panzer das Finale, titled , was released by Kadokawa under their MF Comics Alive Series label. , it has been published in a single volume in Japan.

Girls und Panzer das Finale: Keizoku High School's Starving Art of Dining
A manga spin-off illustrated by Ashimoto☆Yoika, titled , was serialized in Monthly Dengeki PlayStation Comic magazine from November 28, 2018, to March 28, 2020. It follows Mika, Aki, and Mikko of Keizoku High School struggling with their meals due to financial difficulties. A total of two volumes were published in Japan from June 10, 2019, to June 27, 2020.

Original video animations
The Blu-ray and DVD of the films in the Girls und Panzer das Finale series include OVAs. Mishuzima stated in September 2021 that the second OVA would have Western influence. That month, Saori Onishi and Azusa Tadokoro were announced to respectively voice Jane and Belle.

References

External links
  
 
 
 
 

2017 anime films
2019 anime films
2021 anime films
2023 anime films
Actas
Film series introduced in 2017
Films scored by Shirō Hamaguchi
Japanese sequel films
Japanese-language films
Sentai Filmworks
Showgate films
Fiction about tanks